Tomperrow is a hamlet between Threemilestone and Baldhu in Cornwall, England, United Kingdom.

References

Hamlets in Cornwall